Vok or Vök may refer to:

Vök, an Icelandic indie electro band.
Vok, a race of fictional aliens from the Transformers universe, see List of Beast Wars and Beast Machines characters#Non-aligned characters
Vok Beverages, Australian drinks manufacturer
Vök, an Icelandic term for Polynya
Vlky (in Hungarian Vök), a village and municipality in Senec District in the Bratislava Region, in western Slovakia

VOK may refer to:
Voice of Kenya, now known as the Kenya Broadcasting Corporation
Voice of Korea, DPRK radio program
Volk Field Air National Guard Base (IATA code)